Hans Rüegsegger (born 6 May 1916, date of death unknown) was a Swiss football manager.

Managerial career
From 1951 to 1952, Rüegsegger managed Solothurn. During the 1954 FIFA World Cup, Rüegsegger worked as a fitness coach for Switzerland under manager Karl Rappan. After Rappan's departure after the competition, Rüegsegger was named as caretaker manager, managing Switzerland twice, resulting in one draw and one loss. After his stint managing Switzerland, Rüegsegger returned to club management, managing Biel-Bienne for three years. On 6 January 1960, Rüegsegger was part of the Swiss coaching staff under Branislav Sekulić in a 3–0 loss against Italy.

References

Sportspeople from Geneva
1916 births
Date of death unknown
Year of death unknown
Switzerland national football team managers
Swiss football managers
FC Solothurn managers
FC Biel-Bienne managers
Association football coaches